VKG may refer to:

Viru Keemia Grupp, a chemical company
Vampire Knight, an anime
NSW Police, The New South Wales Police Force radio call sign known as VKG
Thomas Cook Airlines Scandinavia, ICAO
SunClass Airlines, ICAO
Rạch Giá Airport, IATA